István Raggambi (8 February 1905 – 9 December 1961) was a Hungarian sprinter. He competed in the men's 100 metres at the 1928 Summer Olympics.

References

1905 births
1961 deaths
Athletes (track and field) at the 1928 Summer Olympics
Hungarian male sprinters
Olympic athletes of Hungary
Place of birth missing